Ivan Yanakov may refer to:
Ivan Yanakov (pianist), Bulgarian pianist
Ivan Yanakov (footballer), Ukrainian footballer